Hasel (also called Haselbach) is a river of Hesse, Germany. It is a right tributary of the Orb in Bad Orb.

See also
List of rivers of Hesse

Rivers of Hesse
Rivers of Germany